Erkoç is a Turkish surname. Notable people with the surname include:

 Fatih Erkoç (born 1953), Turkish jazz and pop music singer and composer
 Hasibe Erkoç, Turkish boxer
 Bülent Ersoy (born Erkoç), Turkish singer and actress

Turkish-language surnames